Carmi le Roux (born 30 March 1993) is a South African cricketer. He was included in Gauteng's squad for the 2016 Africa T20 Cup. In August 2017, he was named in Benoni Zalmi's squad for the first season of the T20 Global League. However, in October 2017, Cricket South Africa initially postponed the tournament until November 2018, with it being cancelled soon after.

He made his first-class debut for Gauteng in the 2017–18 Sunfoil 3-Day Cup on 12 October 2017. In September 2018, he was named in Gauteng's squad for the 2018 Africa T20 Cup. The following month, he was named in Nelson Mandela Bay Giants' squad for the first edition of the Mzansi Super League T20 tournament. In September 2019, he was named in Gauteng's squad for the 2019–20 CSA Provincial T20 Cup.

In June 2021, he was selected to take part in the Minor League Cricket tournament in the United States following the players' draft.

References

External links
 

1993 births
Living people
South African cricketers
Gauteng cricketers
Nelson Mandela Bay Giants cricketers
Cricketers from Johannesburg
White South African people